Wolfram syndrome, also called DIDMOAD (diabetes insipidus, diabetes mellitus, optic atrophy, and deafness), is a rare autosomal-recessive genetic disorder that causes childhood-onset diabetes mellitus, optic atrophy, and deafness as well as various other possible disorders.

It was first described in four siblings in 1938 by Dr. Don J. Wolfram, M.D. The disease affects the central nervous system (especially the brainstem).

Causes
Wolfram syndrome was initially thought to be caused by mitochondrial dysfunction due to its symptoms and several reports of mitochondrial mutations. However, it has now been established that Wolfram syndrome is caused by endoplasmic reticulum dysfunction.

Two genetic forms have been described: Wolfram syndrome 1 (WFS1), and Wolfram syndrome 2 (WFS2).

WFS1
The WFS1 or wolframin gene  provides instructions for making the wolframin protein. The WFS1 gene is active in cells throughout the body, with strong activity in the heart, brain, lungs, inner ear, and pancreas. The pancreas provides enzymes that help digest food, and it also produces the hormone insulin. Insulin controls how much glucose (a type of sugar) is passed from the blood into cells for conversion to energy.

Within cells, wolframin is located in a structure called the endoplasmic reticulum. Among its many activities, the endoplasmic reticulum folds and modifies newly formed proteins so they have the correct 3-dimensional shape to function properly. The endoplasmic reticulum also helps transport proteins, fats, and other materials to specific sites within the cell or to the cell surface. The function of wolframin is unknown. Based on its location in the endoplasmic reticulum, however, it may play a role in protein folding or cellular transport. In the pancreas, wolframin may help fold a protein precursor of insulin (called proinsulin) into the mature hormone that controls blood glucose levels. Research findings also suggest that wolframin may help maintain the correct cellular level of charged calcium atoms (calcium ions) by controlling how much is stored in the endoplasmic reticulum. In the inner ear, wolframin may help maintain the proper levels of calcium ions or other charged particles that are essential for hearing.

More than 30 WFS1 mutations have been identified in individuals with a form of nonsyndromic deafness (hearing loss without related signs and symptoms affecting other parts of the body) called DFNA6. Individuals with DFNA6 deafness cannot hear low tones (low-frequency sounds), such as a tuba or the "m" in moon. DFNA6 hearing loss is unlike most forms of nonsyndromic deafness that affect high tones (high-frequency sounds), such as birds chirping, or all frequencies of sound. Most WFS1 mutations replace one of the protein building blocks (amino acids) used to make wolframin with an incorrect amino acid. One mutation deletes an amino acid from wolframin. WFS1 mutations probably alter the 3-dimensional shape of wolframin, which could affect its function. Because the function of wolframin is unknown, however, it is unclear how WFS1 mutations cause hearing loss. Some researchers suggest that altered wolframin disturbs the balance of charged particles in the inner ear, which interferes with the hearing process.

Other disorders - caused by mutations in the WFS1 gene 

Mutations in the WFS1 gene cause Wolfram syndrome, which is also known by the acronym DIDMOAD. This syndrome is characterised by childhood-onset diabetes mellitus (DM), which results from the improper control of glucose due to the lack of insulin; a gradual loss of vision caused by optic atrophy (OA), in which the nerve that connects the eye to the brain wastes away; and deafness (D). This syndrome can sometimes cause diabetes insipidus (DI), a condition in which the kidneys cannot conserve water. Other complications that affect the bladder and nervous system may also occur.  Researchers have identified more than 100 WFS1 mutations that cause Wolfram syndrome. Some mutations delete or insert DNA from the WFS1 gene. As a result, little or no wolframin is present in cells. Other mutations replace one of the protein building blocks (amino acids) used to make wolframin with an incorrect amino acid. These mutations appear to reduce wolframin activity dramatically. Researchers suggest that the loss of wolframin disrupts the production of insulin, which leads to poor glucose control and diabetes mellitus. It is unclear how WFS1 mutations lead to other features of Wolfram syndrome.

WFS2 

The dysfunction of the CISD2 gene can cause WFS2.

Diagnosis 
Patients past medical history can help diagnosis as it may indicate symptoms such as having diabetes mellitus and then developing vision loss. Blood tests can assist with diagnosis as they determine systems within the body are being affected. MRI scans can also help diagnose and determine the level of damage to the brain and body system's.

Treatment
There is no known direct treatment. Current treatment efforts focus on managing the complications of Wolfram syndrome, such as diabetes mellitus and diabetes insipidus. However a number of symptoms can be managed to improve quality of life. These include: insulin for diabetes alongside other medications for this. Desmopressin to treat diabetes insipidus, antibiotics for UTI, hearing aids of cochlear implants for hearing loss and supportive aids for visual loss such as magnifying glasses. New treatment advances include research evaluating ER calcium stabilizers and repurposed drugs/small molecules to reduce ER stress and reduce apoptosis, thus slowing progression of Wolfram syndrome.

A three tiered approach toward the treatment of Wolfram syndrome includes stopping disease progression, protecting and regrowing remaining tissue, and replacing and repairing pathogenic genes.

Prognosis
The first symptom is typically diabetes mellitus, which is usually diagnosed around the age of 6. The next symptom to appear is often optic atrophy, the wasting of optic nerves, around the age of 11. The first signs of this are loss of colour vision and peripheral vision. The condition worsens over time, and people with optic atrophy are usually blind within 8 years of the first symptoms.  Life expectancy of people suffering from this syndrome is about 30 years.

Research 

Recent advances in research have occurred toward establishing a treatment to slow progression of Wolfram syndrome.  The search for an ER calcium stabilizer and a molecular prosthetic is ongoing  Endoplasmic reticulum (ER) calcium levels are lower in patients with Wolfram syndrome, leading to cell dysfunction and death. Dantrolene sodium is currently under investigation to determine if it can delay the progression of Wolfram syndrome.

ER stress caused by the expression of mutant wolframin protein can ultimately result in cell death or apoptosis. Research is currently underway to evaluate several possible repurposed drugs and small molecules to reduce ER stress in Wolfram syndrome and slow progression of the disease.  Sodium valproate is currently under investigation to determine if it can slow the progression of Wolfram syndrome.

See also
 WFS1
 Chromosome 4 disorders
 Nonsyndromic deafness
 List of rare diseases

References

External links 

 OMIM DIDMOAD search
 Genetics Home Reference WFS1 

Mitochondrial diseases
Deafness
Rare diseases
Syndromes